Château de Bonnefontaine  is a château in Altwiller in the department of Bas-Rhin, France. It was completed between 1818 and 1822. Its neo-classical Palladian portico is decorated with sphinxes.

The mineral water spring was discovered in 1603. This gave the idea in 1816 to a banker from Basel to build a thermal spa with castle, park and dance hall, since destroyed. The banker sold the estate in 1836. Since 1878 it has been owned by the Schlumberger family. It became a listed monument historique in 1991.

References

Châteaux in Bas-Rhin
Monuments historiques of Bas-Rhin
Houses completed in 1822
1822 establishments in France